The International Amateur Radio Union (IARU) is an international confederation of national organisations that allows a forum for common matters of concern to amateur radio operators worldwide, and collectively represents matters to the International Telecommunication Union (ITU). The International Amateur Radio Union was founded in 1925 and, as of July 2021, it is composed of 172 national member societies.

History
Following an informal meeting in 1924 of representatives from France, Great Britain, Belgium, Switzerland, Italy, Spain, Luxembourg, Canada, and the United States, a plan was formulated to hold an International Amateur Congress in Paris, France, in April 1925. This Congress was held for the purpose of founding an international amateur radio organization. The Congress was attended by representatives of 23 countries in Europe, Americas, and Asia. A constitution for the IARU was adopted on April 17, and the formation of the International Amateur Radio Union was ratified on April 18, 1925. In the current era, this is the date (April 18) on which World Amateur Radio Day is celebrated.
The protocol of the congress was written in English, French and Esperanto.

Governance 
The IARU has an elected President and Vice President, an appointed Secretary and other officials (including regional representatives) forming an Administrative Council. These office holders are presently Timothy Ellam, VE6SH (Canada), President; Ole Garpestad, LA2RR (Norway), Vice-President; and Joel Harrison, W5ZN (USA), Secretary.  The IARU International Secretariat (IARUIS) is operated by a member society after election by members. Currently, the American Radio Relay League (ARRL) operates the IARUIS from its headquarters in Newington, Connecticut, USA.

Regional organisation 

The IARU is organised into three regions, named Region 1, Region 2, and Region 3. These regions correspond to the regulatory regions used by the International Telecommunication Union. Each region has an Executive Committee, typically composed of a President, Vice-President, Secretary, Treasurer, and several Directors. These regional officers are elected by representatives from the member societies at triennial regional conferences. Coordinators may be appointed by the Executive Committee of their region to support particular areas within the region, or to promote certain amateur radio activities within the region. All three regions have appointed Coordinators for Amateur Radio Direction Finding, emergency communications, monitoring for electromagnetic interference, and radio propagation.

IARU Region 1 
IARU Region 1 includes the member societies representing amateur radio operators in Africa, Europe, the Middle East, and northern Asia. IARU Region 1 has the largest number of member societies among the three IARU regions, and has been the source of several international initiatives. IARU Region 1 lobbying efforts led to the creation of the 30 meter, 17 meter, and 12 meter amateur radio bands, improving the standardization of reciprocal licensing, promoting Amateur Radio Direction Finding and initiating youth related activities, known as "the Youngsters On the Air project" (YOTA)  

Executive officers:
President:  Sylvain Azarian, F4GKR
Vice-President:  Hani Raad, OD5TE
Secretary:  Mats Espling, SM6EAN
Treasurer:  Andreas Thiemann, HB9JOE

IARU Region 2 
IARU Region 2 includes the member societies representing amateur radio operators in the Americas. The organization of IARU Region 2 was founded in 1964 when representatives from 15 national radio societies attended the First Panamerican Radio Amateur Congress in Mexico City, Mexico. Antonio Pita, XE1CCP was the region's first elected president.

Executive officers:
President:  Ramón Santoyo, XE1KK
Vice-President:  José Arturo Molina, YS1MS
Secretary:  George Gorsline, VE3YV
Treasurer:  John Bellows, K0QB

IARU Region 3
IARU Region 3 includes the member societies representing amateur radio operators in Australia, most of Asia, and the Pacific Islands. Although most of their membership is located in other IARU regions, the American Radio Relay League and the Radio Society of Great Britain are full member societies of IARU Region 3. The ARRL represents amateur radio operators in American Samoa, Guam, the Northern Marianas, and other dependent territories in the Pacific Ocean. The RSGB represents amateur radio operators in the British Indian Ocean Territory. IARU Region 3 has a special emphasis on promoting the harmonization of license qualifications in an effort to promote easier reciprocal operations by amateur radio operators in the region.

Executive officers:
President:  Wisnu Widjaja, YB0AZ
Secretary:  Shizuo Endo, JE1MUI

Countries without IARU member societies 
* = Amateur radio licenses not issued in this country

GAREC - Global Amateur Radio Emergency Communications Conferences

The Global Amateur Radio Emergency Communications Conference or "GAREC" is a yearly conference held by the International Amateur Radio Union for discussion of amateur radio operation during natural disasters and other emergencies with the motto, "Saving lives through emergency communications". GAREC was first held in Tampere, Finland in 2005, coinciding with the adoption of the Tampere Convention, a globally binding emergency communications treaty that had been signed in Tampere in 1998. In later conferences, the venue has attempted to rotate in sequence through ITU Regions 1, 2 and 3 (though not necessarily in that particular order).

Radiosport 

The IARU organises and promotes radiosport activities throughout the world. The IARU  promulgates the rules used for high-speed telegraphy and sponsors regional and world championships. The IARU also promulgates the rules used by most competitions in amateur radio direction finding, including IARU-sponsored regional and world championships. The IARU also sponsors the annual IARU HF World Championship in amateur radio contesting. The IARU does not directly administer any of these radiosport events, but authorises and sponsors them through host organisations.

Operating Station and the WAC Award 
The IARU maintains a radio station at its headquarters in Newington, Connecticut. Its callsign is NU1AW. As an amateur radio station licensed by the U.S. Federal Communications Commission the "1" stands for its location in the New England area. "NU" was taken from the pre-1928 era when amateurs made up their own prefixes, and informally used these letters to show they were in "North America—USA". The "AW" suffix represents the connection with the American Radio Relay League, whose own station is W1AW. NU1AW is frequently active during amateur radio contests.

For many years the IARU has issued the Worked All Continents certificate to amateurs who contact fellow hams in the six permanently populated continental areas of the world.  Special awards and endorsements for various bands and modes are also available.

See also

International distress frequency#Amateur radio frequencies

References

External links 

 IARU web site 
 Current list of IARU Member Societies 
 IARU Region 1 web site 
 IARU Region 2 web site
 IARU Region 3 web site

Amateur radio organizations
Organizations established in 1925